Betrayed by Rita Hayworth is a 1968 novel by the Argentine novelist Manuel Puig.  It was Puig's first novel.

Literary critic Jean Franco writes that the book "was a revelation when it appeared, exploding once and for all the simplistic notions of American cultural imperialism." The book features what would become Puig's customary interests in mass culture, particularly Hollywood film. As Franco observes, "Set in a small provincial town in Buenos Aires province, the novel traces the intense affective relationship between Toto and his mother and friends, a relationship in which Hollywood films such as Blood and Sand and The Great Waltz provide somewhat bizarre models for an affective life which is not satisfied either by religion or the state."

With Puig's subsequent novel, Boquitas pintadas (Heartbreak Tango) of 1969, the book was a key text in the transition from Boom to post-Boom in Latin American fiction.

Bibliography

Notes

References
. Third edition.

Novels by Manuel Puig
1968 novels
Novels set in Argentina
1968 debut novels